Ottewell may refer to:

 Ottewell, Edmonton, a neighbourhood of Edmonton, Alberta, Canada
 Ben Ottewell (born 1976), British musician
 Sid Ottewell (1919–2012), British footballer

See also
 Otwell (disambiguation)